Rhein-Sieg-Kreis I is an electoral constituency (German: Wahlkreis) represented in the Bundestag. It elects one member via first-past-the-post voting. Under the current constituency numbering system, it is designated as constituency 97. It is located in southwestern North Rhine-Westphalia, comprising the eastern part of the Rhein-Sieg-Kreis district.

Rhein-Sieg-Kreis I was created for the inaugural 1949 federal election. Since 2002, it has been represented by Elisabeth Winkelmeier-Becker of the Christian Democratic Union (CDU).

Geography
Rhein-Sieg-Kreis I is located in southwestern North Rhine-Westphalia. As of the 2021 federal election, it comprises the municipalities of Eitorf, Hennef (Sieg), Lohmar, Much, Neunkirchen-Seelscheid, Niederkassel, Ruppichteroth, Siegburg, Troisdorf, and Windeck from the Rhein-Sieg-Kreis district.

History
Rhein-Sieg-Kreis I was created in 1949, then known as Siegkreis. In the 1965 and 1969 elections, it was named Siegkreis I – Bonn-Land. It acquired its current name in the 1972 election. In the 1949 election, it was North Rhine-Westphalia constituency 11 in the numbering system. From 1953 through 1961, it was number 70. From 1965 through 1998, it was number 64. From 2002 through 2009, it was number 98. Since the 2013 election, it has been number 97.

Originally, the constituency was coterminous with the Siegkreis district. In the 1965 through 1976 elections, it comprised the district of Landkreis Bonn as well as the modern municipalities of Bad Honnef, Königswinter, Niederkassel, Troisdorf, and Sankt Augustin from the Siegkreis district. It acquired its current borders in the 1980 election.

Members
The constituency has been held by the Christian Democratic Union (CDU) during all but two Bundestag terms since its creation in 1949. It was first represented by Peter Etzenbach of the CDU from 1949 to 1961, followed by Georg Kliesing under 1976. Franz Möller served a single term from 1976 to 1980, being succeeded by Adolf Herkenrath. Andreas Krautscheid was elected in 1994 and served a single term. The Social Democratic Party (SPD) won the constituency in 1998, and Uwe Göllner served as representative. The CDU regained it in 2005 with candidate Elisabeth Winkelmeier-Becker. She was re-elected in 2009, 2013, 2017, and 2021.

Election results

2021 election

2017 election

2013 election

2009 election

References

Federal electoral districts in North Rhine-Westphalia
Rhein-Sieg-Kreis
Constituencies established in 1949
1949 establishments in West Germany